Jackson Alan Tibolla Rodrigues (Porto Alegre, May 11, 1990) is a Brazilian soccer defender who plays for Coritiba. He has previously played for Juventude (2009), Ponte Preta (2010) and Boa Esporte (2011).

He played in the Campeonato Brasileiro Série B for Juventude and Boa Esporte.

References

External links 
 Jackson page at Coritiba official website

1990 births
Living people
Footballers from Porto Alegre
Brazilian footballers
Association football defenders
Coritiba Foot Ball Club players
Esporte Clube Juventude players
Associação Atlética Ponte Preta players